"Slap" is the fourth single from Ludacris' fifth album Release Therapy (2006).

Song information
"Slap" is an account of poverty on Bush America. Its narrator explains that he is feeling tired about working a lot and getting a low wage, and because of this, he has thoughts about beating (in the uncensored version, killing) his boss. His frustration is then explained to be bigger than that: his best friend was murdered just a day before. He also explains that he has thoughts about robbing a bank to have enough money to feed his newborn baby. Later, at the end of the song, his car is robbed and he expresses an ever-bigger disappointment at the government. According to Allmusic reviewer Marisa Brown, Ludacris' character in the song has these thoughts because he is suffering from depression.

Music video
The music video was released early in 2007. It is based on Martin Scorsese's Taxi Driver, with Ludacris as Travis Bickle, with many references to the movie, including Ludacris kicking over his TV while watching President Bush and doing the iconic "You talkin' to me?" in an interlude. The video shows Ludacris as a taxi driver (wearing the same jacket as Robert De Niro) and the video ends with Ludacris storming a brothel and punching the bouncer and a prostitute's customer, in a similar fashion to Taxi Driver'''s ending, but without the use of guns. It is dedicated to Ludacris' father and best friend Wayne Bridges as it is said at the end of the video. In the scene where Ludacris is working out he is seen wearing a fan T-shirt of the Paratroopers Brigade of the Israel Defense Forces.

Usage in television
"Slap" first gained media attention after Fox News conservative commentator Bill O'Reilly criticized the lyrical content of the song (which uses the word "nigga" forty times, although it is only used as a repeated element of the chorus, also the anti-Bush lyrical content) in his television program. He stated that Ludacris should have not won the Grammy Award for Best Rap Album in the 49th ceremony (that took place a day earlier, on February 11, 2007) because of the song.

Credits and personnel
The credits for "Slap" are adapted from the liner notes of Release Therapy''.
Recording
 Recorded at: The Ludaplex in Atlanta, Georgia and Nasty's Crib and The Field, both in Orlando, Florida.

Personnel
 Ludacris – vocals, songwriting  
 The Runners – producers
 Johnny Mollings – songwriting
 Lenny Mollings – songwriting, recording, guitar
 Andrew Harr – songwriting
 Jermaine Jackson – songwriting
 Misty Fluellen – additional vocals
 Joshua Monroy – recording
 Dru Harr – recording
 Mayne – all instruments
 Phil Tan – mixing
 Josh Houghkirk – additional engineering
 Bernie Grundman – mastering

Charts

References

External links

2006 songs
2007 singles
Ludacris songs
Def Jam Recordings singles
Songs written by Ludacris
Song recordings produced by the Runners
Songs written by Jermaine Jackson (hip hop producer)
Songs written by Andrew Harr
Music videos directed by Philip Andelman